The 2009 FC Dallas season was the fourteenth season of the team's existence. It began on March 21 with a 3–1 home loss to the Chicago Fire and ended with a 2–1 away loss to Seattle Sounders FC on October 24. A win in that game would have sent the team to the playoffs.

Squad

First-team squad
As of June 20, 2009.

Club

Management

Other information

Competitions

Overall

Major League Soccer

Standings

Results summary

Matches

MLS

U.S. Open Cup qualification

References

External links 
2009 Schedule

FC Dallas seasons
Dallas
Dallas
FC Dallas